Mangrol is a town and (now a city) a minor port in Junagadh district in the state of Gujarat, western India. It was formerly the seat of the princely state of Mangrol. Pin code of Mangrol is 362225.

Geography 

It has an average elevation of 18 metres (59 feet).

Demographics 
 India census, Mangrol had a population of 55,094. Males constitute 51% of the population and females 49%. Mangrol has an average literacy rate of 58%, lower than the national average of 59.5%: male literacy is 69%, and female literacy is 48%. In Mangrol, 16% of the population is under 6 years of age.

Educational institutes 
 Tirupati school - Best Gujarati medium School in Mangrol
 Shri Shardagram - This historic valuable Institutional Campus is under Shri Bharat Sarswati Mandir Sansad, Mangrol.
 The Natural Education Academy - Below Average English Medium School
 Ajay secondary & higher secondary school'-
The institution was established in 1973 by Shri Kulinbhai Desai & Smt Vasanti Bahen Desai.At present KG section & Std 1st to 12th classes run by the school management. The school has an excellent past, present and future. The school Pariwar is working hard to build the brilliant career of each students. "Service to the nation" is the motto of the institute.

 Tower Pay Cen School - Very old Government primary school in city. DISE CODE 24120706402

Fishing industry 
Mangrol is an important harbour as far as the fish industry is considered. There are many fisheries located here and it exports to many European nations. The fishermen of Mangrol are infamous for being caught many-a-times by the Pakistan Coast Guard for entering their naval territories in search of fish.

References 

Cities and towns in Junagadh district